Noviken VLF Transmitter is a facility used by NATO for transmitting messages to submerged submarines on 16.4 kHz under the callsign JXN. It is situated near Gildeskål, Norway and  uses as antenna three wires spun between two mountains. The longest of these spans is 2,375 metres long.

The transmitter building is situated at 66° 58′ 58″ N, 13° 52′ 23″ E.

External links
https://web.archive.org/web/20160303192142/http://www.fofo.no/forsvaretsforum.no/Lyd%2Bi%2Bgammel%2Bsender.-mwRLI5D.ips

Buildings and structures in Nordland
Gildeskål
Military radio systems
NATO installations in Norway
Transmitter sites in Norway